Carlos Augusto Ochoa Mendoza (born 5 March 1978) is a Mexican former professional footballer who played as a striker.

He started his career as a substitute for Necaxa in 1999, and was part of their squad that finished third in the 2000 FIFA Club World Championship. He later rose to prominence playing with Tigres UANL, where he reached the final. From Tigres, he was transferred to CA Osasuna of Pamplona in La Liga, but saw little action and was returned to Tigres. He has also played with Querétaro and Chiapas, where Salvador Cabañas and he formed a dominant forward offense in the 2000s. He then moved to Monterrey where he played for two years.

In December 2008, Ochoa was loaned to Club Deportivo Guadalajara on a one-year deal with an option for sale.

Ochoa stated that he would be honored to end his career with the Guadalajara jersey. He also said he had wanted for years to play for Chivas, but since they never made an offer, he stayed with Monterrey. During the Interliga 2009, Ochoa scored four goals in three games for Chivas.  In the final he scored an own goal but Chivas still won the Interliga Championship.

In his Clausura 2009 debut, he scored 2 goals against Cruz Azul, which ended in a 3–3 draw. Due to poor performance, though, Ochoa was sent to CD Tapatio, the Chivas second-division affiliate.  When new head coach Paco Ramirez took rein of Chivas, Ochoa was called back up to the first team.

At the end of the season, Chivas passed on purchasing Ochoa and he was sold by Monterrey to Santos Laguna for the Apertura 2009 season. After being purchased by Santos Laguna, he has been also loaned to Chiapas and Tigres UANL. After his loan to Tigres UANL he returned to Santos Laguna.

International career
During Javier Aguirre's era in front of Mexico, he was called up for the 2002 World Cup qualifying matches, but in the end he was left out of the squad that participated in the 2002 World Cup. Five years later, he finally got another chance to represent his national team again.

Career statistics

International

International goals

References

External links

1978 births
Living people
People from Apatzingán
Footballers from Michoacán
Mexican footballers
Mexican people of Basque descent
Liga MX players
Mexican expatriate footballers
La Liga players
Club Necaxa footballers
Tigres UANL footballers
CA Osasuna players
Querétaro F.C. footballers
Chiapas F.C. footballers
C.F. Monterrey players
C.D. Guadalajara footballers
C.D. Veracruz footballers
Santos Laguna footballers
Atlético Morelia players
Atlas F.C. footballers
Mexico international footballers
2002 CONCACAF Gold Cup players
Association football forwards